T. Wilkie was a Scottish footballer who played in the Football League for Blackburn Rovers.

References

Year of birth unknown
Date of death unknown
Scottish footballers
Blackburn Rovers F.C. players
English Football League players
Association football goalkeepers